Heliothis decorata is a species of moth of the family Noctuidae. It is found in India.

References 

decorata
Moths of Africa
Moths of Asia
Moths described in 1881